is a video game series of roguelike and role-playing games developed by Spike Chunsoft (formerly Chunsoft). Unlike licensed crossovers within the Mystery Dungeon franchise, this series features original characters; including the eponymous rōnin protagonist Shiren and his traveling companion and talking weasel Koppa, with a plot and the location set generally in feudal Japan, and though indicative of the core games, which is navigating through a randomly generated dungeon using turn-based moves. , there have been multiple games across Nintendo and Sony platforms, mobile devices, Windows, and Steam, as well as few other medias released throughout the years.

These games are based on procedural generated dungeons ("mystery dungeons"), which are dungeons with unique corridors and rooms for each floors every time the player enters in one. In dungeons, they have to fight monsters while collecting items to survive throughout the adventure, whether to protect against stronger foes, avoid unseen traps and hazards, or avoid starving, with the goal of exiting the dungeon after a fixed number of floors.

Gameplay 

Most Mystery Dungeon games center around exploring a dungeon with randomly generated layouts and fights. These are in a turn-based manner, where the player's every action such as attacking or walking is met by the opponents' action. Chunsoft described the gameplay as being like chess. Escape from the dungeon is allowed in certain places or using certain items. In most games from this series, when the player loses the game by fainting, they loses everything and has to start from scratch. Features distinct to the Shiren the Wanderer series include the "Melding Jar" which allows players to synthesize items and weapons into more powerful ones.

A unique gameplay element that first appeared in Shiren the Wanderer GB: Moonlit-Village Monster and appeared later in the Mystery Dungeon franchise and its crossovers is rescuing other players via passwords. They went with the idea of player sharing passwords instead of them using the Game Boy's Game Link Cable in order to help others, since there were not many owners of the cable. This idea was expanded in Shiren the Wanderer Gaiden: Asuka the Swordswoman with the addition of online support. Within the online support, players received new dungeons, called either "Weekly Dungeon"; a dungeon that can be played online on a weekly basis, or "Challenge Dungeon"; a more difficult dungeon where useful items appeared rarely. Another gameplay that was introduced in this series was the ability to collect monsters in dungeons via an item in Shiren the Wanderer 2: Oni Invasion! Shiren Castle!, along with a place to let the player see their collection. It was later reused in the franchise, notably in Dragon Quest: Young Yangus and the Mysterious Dungeon, and the Pokémon Mystery Dungeon series minus the use of an item.

Koichi Nakamura explained that the appeal of the Mystery Dungeon series is that every game is different and that players skills are constantly being challenged, which helps the player feel deeply involved. Seiichiro Nagahata, who supervised and planned the development of the Nintendo DS version of Mystery Dungeon: Shiren the Wanderer, explained that the Mystery Dungeon series is all about "tension" and "reasoning".

Development 
Before the series' creation, the Mystery Dungeon franchise had only one game known as Torneko's Great Adventure: Mystery Dungeon in 1993. It was Chunsoft's first try on bringing the roguelike genre to home console after Sega's attempt, which was met with little success.

History
The company wanted to work on the new features and gameplay mechanics added in NetHack, a variant of Rogue, one of them was being able to steal items from a shopkeeper. However, it was not possible to translate the new content from NetHack with characters from the Dragon Quest series; one such with Torneko who is a merchant.

The scenarios present throughout the series were written so they would not interfere too much into its roguelike genre. Its story length is noticeably smaller than the other crossovers, but also intriguing for each title as they are mixed with its difficulty. The series' scenarist, Shin-ichiro Tomie, Initially, he has suggested to put the setting of the series in feudal Japan, compared to the previous Mystery Dungeon title. Character designer Kaoru Hasegawa later took part during the production of Mystery Dungeon 2: Shiren the Wanderer after his first contribution in Chunsoft's Kamaitachi no Yoru as an artist. In an interview with the company, they wanted someone who could work on the then sequel to Torneko's Great Adventure, but he was not familiar with the title, nor the roguelike genre at the time of the interview. After being interested in the genre by playing through the game and being employed in the company, he was able work in the game, with respecting the theme Tomie imposed to the game instead of a western art style, like Akira Toriyama's Dragon Quest characters. Many drafts were made for the silent protagonist of the eponymous game, and its mascot monster the Mamel, but most of them were lost. Since then, he has contributed to the series as a character designer, occasionally as an art director like in Shiren the Wanderer 2: Oni Invasion! Shiren Castle!. Two years after the release of Torneko's Great Adventure, Mystery Dungeon 2: Shiren the Wanderer was released as the company's second work for the Mystery Dungeon series, with a new world setting and unique characters.

Many titles from this series were developed simultaneously throughout the years, where one title was focused on creating original features in its gameplay than the other for which they were forced to focus on "traditional dungeon types" due to the limitations on the other hardware; Mystery Dungeon 2: Shiren the Wanderer on Super Famicom and Shiren the Wanderer GB: Moonlit-Village Monster on Game Boy, and Shiren the Wanderer 2: Oni Invasion! Shiren Castle! on Nintendo 64 and Shiren the Wanderer GB2: Magic Castle of the Desert on Game Boy Color. Shiren the Wanderer 4: The Eye of God and the Devil's Navel and Shiren the Wanderer: The Tower of Fortune and the Dice of Fate were also developed simultaneously, albeit both of them were released on Nintendo DS in 2010.

Even if the series has not received a brand new title since 2010, there have been numerous indications of potential returning of the series in recent years. In 2018, Mitsutoshi Sakurai answered for potential ports of the series in the future, although it will be a challenge as employees said it will not be a success. In 2020, Tomie has left a secret message in the Nintendo Switch and Steam ports of The Tower of Fortune and the Dice of Fate, indicating he is still able to work on the next games if there are enough voices from the fans to green-lit a new Mystery Dungeon game within the company.

Music

The soundtracks were composed by late Dragon Quest composer Koichi Sugiyama, and Hayato Matsuo for this series. Sugiyama made use of East Asian elements for the series, compared to his more European-styled Dragon Quest compositions, using instruments such as a shakuhachi flute. This theme would remain for the series' next titles. Hayato Matsuo later became the main composer for the series, starting in the Game Boy Color release of Magic Castle of the Desert in 2001. Sugiyama has asked Matsuo not to have his music arranged frequently; he had to modify them enough to differ his scores with Sugiyama's for the series. Occasionally, Sugiyama has returned exclusively for contributing a main theme and some battle themes.

Games 

The games are primarily developed and published by Spike Chunsoft, formerly Chunsoft before the merging in 2012. There are exceptions where a few games were developed or published by other companies, whether in Japan or in the west. Across the series, including spin-offs and excluding remakes and ports throughout the years, there have been 11 games released in total, with The Tower of Fortune and the Dice of Fate being the most recent mainline game to be released as both a unique game in 2010, and a ported game as of 2022.

As this series remained in Japan for a long time, it was only in 2008 that it got its first release outside of Japan with the Nintendo DS release of Mystery Dungeon: Shiren the Wanderer, published by Sega. Back then, and even today, there have been fan translations of this series in many languages, including English, such as the fan translation of Oni Invasion! Shiren Castle! completed exactly 21 years after its initial release.

The series had its first spin-off game in 2004, titled Shiren Monsters: Netsal. It is only one game based on its monsters. Its gameplay was notably changed to the sport genre, specifically towards association football, compared to the mainline's roguelike genre. Another game for the series was released for pachinko machines in 2013, titled Shiren the Wanderer: Princess Suzune and the Tower of Slumber.

Other media 
The Shiren the Wanderer series got other media releases throughout the years. One such was Shiren the Wanderer: Flowers Dancing in the Golden Town Amteca, published in December 2004. It is a novella based, and set in a different timeline, of Mystery Dungeon 2: Shiren the Wanderer, featuring new characters.

Reception
Although it has less popularity than the franchise's other crossovers, notably the Pokémon crossover, Pokémon Mystery Dungeon, of which led to confusion onto the series' origins, there exist a moderate fanbase of the series with a majority located in Japan. It has been both praised and criticized for its difficulty, and generally noted for the uneven quality of the randomly generated levels, or "floors", the games produce, which led to generally favorable ratings in Japan and throughout the world. Famitsu awarded a 36/40 to Oni Invasion! Shiren Castle! and a 38/40 to the original release of Magic Castle of the Desert, the highest score the publication had given to a Game Boy Color game. The series, along with its main protagonist Shiren, appeared in video games that were developed or published by Spike Chunsoft, with games like Crypt of the NecroDancer, Terraria, or 428: Shibuya Scramble. Passionate fans of the Shiren the Wanderer series are also commonly called "Shi-Ranger" in Japan.

As of 2022, the series has sold over two million copies, with Mystery Dungeon: Shiren the Wanderer and The Tower of Fortune and the Dice of Fate leading among the other titles.

Notes
  million copies sold from the Mystery Dungeon: Shiren the Wanderer titles,  million copies sold from the Shiren the Wanderer: Moonlit-Village Monster titles,  million copies sold from Shiren the Wanderer 2: Oni Invasion! Shiren Castle!,  million copies sold from the Shiren the Wanderer: Magic Castle of the Desert titles,  million copies sold from the Shiren the Wanderer Gaiden: Asuka the Swordswoman titles,  million copies sold from Shiren Monsters: Netsal,  million copies sold from the Shiren the Wanderer 3: The Sleeping Princess and the Karakuri Mansion titles,  million copies sold from the Shiren the Wanderer 4: The Eye of God and the Devil's Navel titles, 0.5 million copies sold from the Shiren the Wanderer: The Tower of Fortune and the Dice of Fate titles.

References 

Kadokawa Dwango franchises
Role-playing video games
Video game franchises
Video game franchises introduced in 1995
Roguelike video games
Portal fantasy